Frank Scheck is an American film critic. He is best known for his reviews in the New York Post and The Hollywood Reporter. He formerly edited STAGES Magazine and worked as a theater critic for the Christian Science Monitor in the 1990s.

References

External links
Frank Scheck New York Post profile

American film critics
Living people
New York Post people
The Christian Science Monitor people
The Hollywood Reporter people
Year of birth missing (living people)